Courtney Johnson may refer to:

Courtney Johnson (musician) (1939–1996), American banjo player
Courtney Johnson (water polo) (born 1974), American water polo player